Ty the Tasmanian Tiger 3: Night of the Quinkan is a 2005 3D platforming game developed by Krome Studios and published by Activision for the GameCube, PlayStation 2 and Xbox systems, along with a 2D side-scrolling version of the game released for the Game Boy Advance by Fruit Ninja developer Halfbrick. The game was later remastered in HD for Microsoft Windows and was made available through Steam in 2018. It is the only game in the series published by Activision as opposed to Electronic Arts and is also the only game in the series to be rated E10+ by the ESRB.

Gameplay
The overall gameplay remains similar to the game's predecessors, with the game's introduction of Bunyip Stones being a new addition to the series. These stones can be equipped to various boomerang chassis to change their functionality or elemental properties. The stones can be mixed and matched to make unique boomerang combinations, (such as explosive Lasorangs or Multirangs that track enemies). At first, Ty has only one boomerang chassis, and no Bunyip Stones whatsoever. However, new boomerang chassis and Bunyip Stones can be purchased using Opals, the game's currency, from various stores spread across Southern Rivers. Bunyip Stones can also be given as rewards for completing the game's various side-quests. With each boomerang chassis having a limited number of Bunyip Stone slots, the player is forced to strategize which stones they should make use of and which boomerang chassis to equip them to. Certain Bunyip Stones also cancel each other out (mostly the elemental stones [i.e.: Fire and Ice elemental stones can't be used together], and warp stones, which are incompatible with most other stones). Incompatible stones will glow red when equipped to a chassis, and will cancel each other out unless one or the other is removed. Each stone's effect can also be stacked upon itself to increase its effectiveness (two fire Bunyip Stones equipped to the same chassis have a greater effect than a single one does, for example).

Another major addition was that of a melee combat system. Unlike in previous games, many enemies are immune to damage from thrown boomerangs. Therefore, unless the player has a sufficiently powerful boomerang or a Bunyip Mech, most enemies can only be defeated by melee combat. Incorporating elements from beat 'em up-style games, melee combat consists of a 5-hit combo, a move that throws enemies up into the air, an aerial juggle combo and the bite move from previous games. Most enemies also possess a health bar that decreases as they take damage, with most taking multiple hits to defeat.

The Fourbie jeep used in the previous game for exploration of the overworld is absent, instead being replaced by a new vehicle, the "Crabmersible". The Crabmersible serves the same purpose as the Fourbie, albeit with included weapons and defenses for battling enemies in the overworld, as well as being able to submerge underwater. The Chopper, Go-Cart and Shadow Bunyip all make a return, and a new Bunyip known as the "Extreme Bunyip" is featured, replacing the auxiliary Bunyips and Battle Bunyip from the previous game. A new vehicle, in the form of a fighter plane known as the "Gunyip", is also introduced and used in certain missions.

Multiplayer is present and consists of "Cart Racing" (similar to Mario Kart) and "Gunyip Dogfighting" (similar to Star Fox 64, although more restrictive), both of which are playable with up to 4 players.

A version of the game was also released for the Game Boy Advance. Like its GBA predecessor, it plays as a 2D platformer as opposed to a 3D platformer. When using the Gunyip, the game switches to a scrolling shooter (similar to Gradius), and when using the Chopper, the game becomes a top-down action game (similar mechanically to Solar Jetman). Unlike the console versions, the Go-Cart and related side-quests and characters are absent, and there are no multiplayer modes available.

Plot
The events of the console and handheld versions of this game differ so greatly, the GBA release should be seen as an alternate retelling of the events in the console version.

Console
Some time after the events of the previous game, the Bunyip Elder Nandu Gili makes contact with Ty the Tasmanian Tiger and his friend  Shazza the Dingo, telling them that an ancient evil arrived in the magical dimension of "The Dreaming" just as Ty's nemesis, a cassowary named Boss Cass, was being freed from Currawong Jail. Requesting their assistance, Ty and Shazza are teleported into the Dreaming by the Elder. When the two arrive, the Bunyip Elder explains that evil spirits known as the Quinkan invaded the sacred realm and tainted it with war and violence. Ty agrees to drive off the Quinkan, but the Elder claims that it would be suicidal, as the Quinkan are immune to conventional weapons such as Ty's Boomerangs. Instead, he suggests that Ty and Shazza locate and acquire the Bunyip Gauntlet, which would give Ty the means to fight the Quinkan.

After acquiring the Gauntlet, Shazza remains behind with the Bunyip Guardian Thigana while Ty proceeds deeper into the Dreaming. Using the Gauntlet and the Shadow Bunyip mech, Ty manages to open up a vortex which sucks the Quinkan out of the Dreaming. Congratulating Ty for successfully liberating the Dreaming, the Bunyip Elder offers to train Ty in how to make proper use of the Bunyip Gauntlet for the future, which he accepts. After training with Thigana and the Bunyip Gauntlet's guardian Mallyaan, The Bunyip Elder teleports Ty and Shazza back to Southern Rivers. While in the teleportation conduit, a Quinkan appears and knocks Shazza away from Ty, causing the two to become separated. Although he spends only moments in the conduit, Ty ends up arriving back in Southern Rivers six months after Shazza as a result of the incident.

Handheld
Following the events of the previous game, Ty and Shazza are contacted by the Bunyip Elder, who teleports them both to The Dreaming. Once they arrive, the Elder explains that evil spirits known as the Quinkan invaded The Dreaming and began wreaking havoc across the realm. While Shazza stays behind with the Bunyip Elder, Ty is tasked with driving the Quinkan out of the Dreaming, and is teleported to the Quinkan Castle deep within the realm. Ty makes contact with Julius when he arrives, who provides him with a newly developed Vortex Bomb capable of sucking all the Quinkan out of the Dreaming. After making his way through the castle, Ty plants the bomb at the castle's weak point and activates it. While he is making his escape, Ty is teleported by the Bunyip Elder back to the real world to evade the Bomb's blast. Although he encounters Shazza while in warp transit, Ty ends up arriving in the real world several months after Shazza does due to the two becoming separated while in the conduit.

When Ty makes it back to Southern Rivers, he arrives in a desolate area overrun with Quinkan. Reuniting with Shazza and Sly, the two explain that they are currently in the town of "New Buramudgee", as the old town was destroyed when the Quinkan invaded Southern Rivers. The invasion also lead to the disbandment of Bush Rescue, which was unable to stop the invaders without Ty's assistance. With Ty safe and sound, the three decide to reform Bush Rescue and drive the Quinkan out of Southern Rivers. All but a few of the former Bush Rescue members rejoin the team, along with Shazza's sister Naomi as the team's new Bunyip Suit mechanic. Buramudgee resident Red the Dog also joins the team, believing that an understanding could potentially be reached with the Quinkan through negotiation rather than violence.

With Ty's help, the reformed Bush Rescue manages to liberate a large portion of Southern Rivers. Along the way, Ty manages to rescue Dennis, who had taken charge of the war effort following Bush Rescue's disbandment and had since been captured by the Quinkan, along with convincing Maurie to rejoin, himself becoming a recluse after establishing a watering hole in the mountains. After liberating the area surrounding New Buramudgee, Dennis informs Ty that a powerful Quinkan guardian known as the Hexaquin is blocking Bush Rescue's access to the other parts of Southern Rivers, and tasks Ty with defeating him. After making it to the Hexaquin's blockade, Ty battles and eventually defeats the creature, allowing Bush Rescue's safe passage through the area.

Following the battle, Ty is informed that Red had deserted Bush Rescue and kidnapped Shazza, handing her over to the Quinkan as a hostage for his own protection. Desperate, Ty and the rest of Bush Rescue reluctantly team up with Boss Cass and Fluffy, with Cass making a promise to locate Shazza in exchange for Ty completing various tasks for him. While Ty is busy completing Cass' assignments, Fluffy challenges him to a race up Whataview Mountain, with Fluffy making sure that Cass keeps his word should he win and Ty becoming her personal slave for a day if he loses. With the new Extreme Bunyip provided by Naomi, Ty achieves a narrow victory against Fluffy. Expressing that the two of them are meant for each other, Fluffy assures Ty that she'll make sure Cass keeps his word and locates Shazza for him.

Once his assignments from Cass are complete, Ty is informed by Cass that Shazza is being held hostage by another Quinkan guardian known as the Dragonquin hiding in the skyline of Cassopolis. Using the Gunyip fighter plane, Ty manages to locate the Dragonquin. He defeats the creature, freeing Shazza and causing the parts of the Dragonquin's body to turn to stone and fall into the forest below. Once freed, Shazza informs Ty that while in custody she overheard the Quinkan making preparations for their leader, the Quinking, to arrive in Southern Rivers.

Upon further research, Julius speculates that the parts of the Dragonquin's body that fell to the ground, which he dubbed Shadow Stones, could be used to power a weapon capable of defeating the Quinking. Upon Dennis' suggestion, Ty goes to see the supposed "Quinking Expert" in the Valley of the Lost for advice, who ends up being Gooboo Steve. He explains that the ultimate weapon capable of defeating the Quinking, the Shadowring, was lost somewhere in the forest and would not function properly even if it were found without the Shadow Stones. With this information, Ty, Julius and Ranger Ken manage find the missing Shadowring and Shadow Stones, completing the ultimate weapon.

With the Shadowring in Ty's possession, Boss Cass informs him that the guardian of the Quinking's territory, the Spiderquin, is the final hurdle between Bush Rescue and the Quinkan leader. Ty makes quick work of the guardian with the Shadowring, and flies to the Quinkan Citadel at the heart of the Quinking's territory with Sly, Shazza and Fluffy. After fighting through the Citadel, the group encounters the Quinking, who reveals that it was Boss Cass who let the Quinkan into Southern Rivers and the two had been working together the whole time. Seeking an opportunity to get revenge on Ty for his past defeats and to rule Southern Rivers unopposed, Cass appears and double crosses both Ty and the Quinking, arming himself with a rocket launcher. He fires a rocket at Ty, but it is intercepted before it can reach him by Fluffy, who sacrifices herself by jumping in front of him at the last moment.

Enraged by Fluffy's death, Ty takes on the Quinking in a final battle to decide the fate of Southern Rivers. While initially evenly matched, the Quinking is unable to overcome the power of Ty's Shadowrings. To gain the upper hand, he proceeds to transform into a larger Godzilla-like form, but Ty manages to overcome this more powerful form and defeat the Quinking after a long battle, restoring peace to Southern Rivers. Some time after the Quinkan are defeated, the lives of Ty, his friends and the residents of New Buramudgee return to normal. Boss Cass is sent back to prison for his crimes, and a statue of Fluffy is erected in the town's square in honor of her sacrifice.

Reception

On Metacritic the game has "mixed or average reviews".  The game was criticized for feeling too similar to previous games in a series that was already feeling to similar to other, more popular games. Matt Casamassina of IGN wrote, "Ty the Tasmanian Tiger 3: Night of the Quinkan is a predictable sequel to the first two iterations of the franchise. That doesn't make it bad. In fact, it's still enjoyable, especially as straightforward platformer for kids. But the Ty series has never been original and this latest version feels like a copy of a copy. Gamers who played and didn't like the other two versions will find nothing new here and Ty fans may find themselves wondering why very little has changed."

Sequel

On 27 July 2012, Krome announced plans for a new Ty The Tasmanian Tiger game to be developed for the iOS to coincide with the series's 10th anniversary, this game was revealed to be Ty the Tasmanian Tiger: Boomerang Blast, released late 2012. On 11 March 2013, Krome Studios announced a 2D Ty title to be released on 24 July 2013 on Xbox Games for Windows 8 PC and/or Tablet. Ty the Tasmanian Tiger 4 was originally released on Xbox Games for Windows 8 PC and tablets titled Ty the Tasmanian Tiger in 2013 then ported to Steam for Microsoft Windows as Ty the Tasmanian Tiger 4 in 2015. It was released on 18 September 2015.

References

External links
 Night of the Quinkan official website

2005 video games
3D platform games
Activision games
GameCube games
Game Boy Advance games
Krome Studios games
PlayStation 2 games
Ty the Tasmanian Tiger
Video game sequels
Open-world video games
Video games developed in Australia
Video games set in Australia
Xbox games
Multiplayer and single-player video games
Windows games
Halfbrick Studios games